Mittelriede is a small river of Lower Saxony, Germany. It is an artificial branch of the Wabe near Braunschweig. It runs parallel to the Wabe, and discharges into the Schunter 300 m downstream from the mouth of the Wabe.

See also
List of rivers of Lower Saxony

Rivers of Lower Saxony
Rivers of Germany